Anita Lallande (June 24, 1949 – December 19, 2021) was a Puerto Rican Olympic swimmer, who holds the record for the most medals won at the Central American and Caribbean Games.

Early years
Lallande was born in San Juan, Puerto Rico, to Joseph Gustave Lallande Jr. and Janice Hoover. Her father was Chairman of the Board of J. Gus Lallande Inc., a food brokerage and distribution business in Puerto Rico. When she was 8 years old, she began her career as a swimmer at the Caparra Country Club.

Central American and Caribbean Games
The Central American and Caribbean Games (or CACs) are a multi-sport regional championship event, held quadrennially (every 4 years), typically in the even-numbered year between consecutive Summer Olympics. The Games are for countries in Central America, the Caribbean, Mexico, Bermuda, and the South American countries of Surinam, Guyana, Colombia and Venezuela.

In 1962, at the age of 13, Lallande made her Olympic debut representing Puerto Rico at the Central American and Caribbean Games held in Kingston, Jamaica and won two Silver and three Bronze medals in swimming. In 1963, she competed in the Pan-American Games held in São Paulo, Brazil and in 1964 in the Olympics held in Tokyo, Japan.

In 1966, the swimming competitions of the Central American and Caribbean Games were held at the Escambrón Olympic swimming pool in San Juan, Puerto Rico. She arrived first in eight individual events and participated in two winning relays. She won a bronze medal in the Medley relay events (200 m and 400 m) in which Margaret Harding, also Puerto Rican, won the gold. Lallande dominated the tests of velocity in the 100 and 200 m's freestyle, in two of the 400 and 800 m's freestyle, the 100 and 200 m's butterfly and the 100 and 200 meters backstroke. Lallande won a total of 10 Gold, 1 Silver and 1 Bronze medal for a total of twelve medals, making her the person with the most medals won that year.

From 1962 to 1966, Lallande won a total of 17 medals, thus holding the record for most medals won in swimming competitions at the Central American and Caribbean Games.

Later life and death
After the games, Lallande announced her retirement from all sports activities and moved to New York City. She later relocated to Annapolis, Maryland, where she died on December 19, 2021, at the age of 72.

See also

 List of Puerto Ricans
 Sports in Puerto Rico
 History of women in Puerto Rico

References

External links

1949 births
2021 deaths
21st-century American women
Puerto Rican female swimmers
Swimmers at the 1963 Pan American Games
Swimmers at the 1964 Summer Olympics
Swimmers at the 1967 Pan American Games
Sportspeople from San Juan, Puerto Rico
Pan American Games bronze medalists for Puerto Rico
Olympic swimmers of Puerto Rico
Pan American Games medalists in swimming
Central American and Caribbean Games gold medalists for Puerto Rico
Central American and Caribbean Games silver medalists for Puerto Rico
Central American and Caribbean Games bronze medalists for Puerto Rico
Competitors at the 1962 Central American and Caribbean Games
Competitors at the 1966 Central American and Caribbean Games
Central American and Caribbean Games medalists in swimming
Medalists at the 1967 Pan American Games